Besley is a surname. People with that name include:

 Kirkland Besley (1902–1994), American hospital administrator and college football player
 Robert Besley (1794–1876), English typographer and Lord Mayor of London
 Besley Clarendon, a typeface designed by Robert Besley
 Tim Besley (disambiguation), several people
 Tina Besley, New Zealand education academic

See also
 Beasley (disambiguation)
 Belsey, a surname
 Edmund Besley Court Kennedy (1818–1848), English explorer in Australia